Royal Tru (often referred to simply as Royal) is a carbonated fruit-flavored soft drink brand owned by The Coca-Cola Company that is exclusive to the Philippines. The brand was introduced in 1922 by the original San Miguel Brewery. Since being acquired by Coca-Cola's Philippines unit in 2007, the brand has become the Philippine counterpart of Coca-Cola's Fanta brand.

History

The Royal brand was first introduced in 1922 by the original San Miguel Brewery as its first non-alcoholic, carbonated beverage. In 1927, San Miguel became the first international bottler of Coca-Cola. The Royal brand became best associated with its orange-flavored soft drink, Royal Tru-Orange.

In 1981, San Miguel spun off its soft drink business (its Coca-Cola franchise and the manufacture of Royal beverages) to a new company known as Coca-Cola Bottlers Philippines, Inc. (CCBPI), a joint-venture with The Coca-Cola Company. The brand continued to be owned by San Miguel until 2007 when it sold the rights to the brand along with its entire interest in CCBPI to The Coca-Cola Company. 

CCBPI was renamed Coca-Cola FEMSA Philippines, Inc. in January 2013 with the entry of Mexico-based Coca-Cola FEMSA S.A. de C.V. Coca-Cola FEMSA Philippines was renamed Coca-Cola Beverages Philippines, Inc. (CCBPI) in December 2018 after the acquisition of 50% interest in the company by Bottling Investments Group (BIG).

Products

Current
 Royal Tru-Orange
 Royal Tru-Grape
 Royal Tru-Lemon
 Royal Tru-Watermelon

Discontinued
 Royal Lem-O-Lime
 Royal Root Beer
 Royal Soda Water
 Royal Tonic Water
 Royal Ginger Ale
 Royal Tru-Orange Light
 Royal Tru-Dalandan
 Royal Tru-Strawberry (available in some Philippine 7-Eleven stores)

Marketing

The beverage targets teenagers as its consumers. The product was available during the 1970s in single-serve bottles and contained orange "pulp bits" (pulp) "from California Valencia oranges".

When San Miguel Corporation became one of the founding members of the Philippine Basketball Association in 1975, its basketball franchise played under the name "Royal Tru-Orange" from 1975 to 1980.

Royal Tru-Orange gained much attention in the mid-1980s following the restoration of democracy in the Philippines, after its logo and formulation (now without the orange pulp) were changed through an advertising campaign that starred teen model RJ Ledesma (playing the role of "Joey").  The first television advertisement in the series, wherein Joey was being egged on by friends to introduce himself to a girl named Jenny, was directed by noted film director Lino Brocka.

In 1992, Royal Tru-Orange released its slogan "Ito Ang Gusto Ko!" which is also a song of the late Francis Magalona.

Slogans
 "Pag-ibig kong Tunay!" ("My Tru Love!") (1973–1982)
 "Royal, natural!" ("Royal, naturally!") (1982–1987)
 "Ako at Royal, natural!" ("Royal and I, naturally!") (1987–1992)
 "Ito ang gusto ko!" ("This is my choice!") (1992–1998)
 "Yan ang tru!" ("That is tru!") (2003–2007)
"Ilabas ang kulit!" ("Bring out the crazy!") (2009–2019)
"Generation Kulit" (2021-)

Controversy
Royal Tru-Orange was one of 300 products of the Philippines barred by the U.S. Food and Drug Administration in 2004 from entering the United States due to "failure to meet its requirements.

References

Coca-Cola brands
Philippine drinks
Orange sodas
Food and drink in the Philippines
Products introduced in 1922